Ian Blake Johnson (born September 25, 1985) is a former American football running back. He played college football at Boise State.

Early years 
Born in Monrovia, California, Johnson attended Damien High School in La Verne, where he was a two-sport star in football and track. In football, he was named Inland Valley Offensive Player of the Year, L.A. Times All-San Gabriel Valley first-team, San Gabriel Valley Tribune All-Area first-team, Daily Bulletin Inland Valley All-Area Team, All-Sierra League MVP, and CIF Division II first-team all-league as a senior. Johnson was also a team captain for the Spartans and set Damien High School records in career rushing yards, season rushing yards (2,009 yards) and points scored (347). He was a high school teammate of Arena Football League star, Nick Davila.

Also a standout track & field athlete, Johnson was an All-Sierra League and All-CIF pick while competing in the 100-meter dash (11.17 s), 200-meter dash (23.03 s), and 4 × 100 m relay (43.38 s).

College career 
Johnson was redshirted for the 2004 season. In 2005, he rushed for 1,445 yards, at that time the second-most by a freshman in Broncos history, scoring 14 touchdowns. In his illustrious career at BSU, Johnson ran for 4,158 yards and 58 touchdowns, surpassing Marshall Faulk to set a new WAC record for career rushing touchdowns.

The Broncos finished the 2006 regular season unbeaten (12–0) and became only the second-team from outside the BCS conferences to play in a BCS bowl game.  They played in the Fiesta Bowl against the Oklahoma Sooners, the year's Big 12 champion. Johnson scored the game-winning two-point conversion in overtime on a Statue of Liberty play to the left side. Boise State defeated Oklahoma 43–42, completing a perfect 13-0 season. Johnson rushed for 100 yards and a touchdown. 
   
Johnson had been considered a dark horse Heisman Trophy candidate. However, shortly after the announcement of his consideration for the Heisman Trophy, a collapsed lung sidelined Johnson for one game and hurt his chances of winning the Heisman. After the end of the 2006 regular season, he led NCAA Division I-A in scoring with 24 touchdowns. On December 7, 2006, Sports Illustrated named Johnson to their 2006 All-American first-team.  This made Johnson the first Boise State athlete to be named to a major All-American team. CBSSports.com also named him All-America in 2006. He was also named to the All-WAC team, won a Division I-A Offensive Player of the Week award, two WAC Offensive Player of the Week awards, and was a semifinalist for the Doak Walker Award. Johnson ran an official 4.58 40-yard dash at Boise State.

Professional career

Pre-draft measurables

Minnesota Vikings 
Johnson ran the fastest 40-yard dash time for a running back at the 2009 NFL Combine with a 4.46. He was signed as a free agent with the Minnesota Vikings. In the fourth game of the preseason, Johnson ran for 2 touchdowns in 17 carries against the Dallas Cowboys. The following season, Johnson was waived by the Vikings on September 4, 2010. He was re-signed to the practice squad two days later.

Arizona Cardinals 
The Arizona Cardinals signed Johnson to their practice squad on September 6, 2010, and he was released three weeks later on  September 27.

Detroit Lions 
The Detroit Lions signed Johnson to their practice squad on November 17, 2010. During the following season's training camp, he was released on September 3, 2011.

Miami Dolphins 
Johnson was signed to the Miami Dolphins' practice squad on September 12, 2011, released on December 14, then signed back to the practice squad on December 29.

Post-football career 
Johnson is an insurance agent through State Farm in Boise.

In November 2010, Johnson joined Kituku and Associates in Boise as a motivational speaker and personal coach. Johnson speaks at schools, businesses, churches, and associations on turning dreams to reality, winning as a team, making the right choices, and overcoming challenges.

Johnson joined Boise radio station KNFL "ESPN Boise 730/96.5" in February 2014.

Personal life 
Following the Fiesta Bowl in 2007, during an interview with Chris Myers, Johnson proposed to his girlfriend Chrissy Popadics, Boise State's head cheerleader, on Fox Sports' postgame coverage. They married on July 28, 2007. According to Johnson, he received about 30 threatening letters, which he handed over to the FBI, from people who objected to his nationally televised marriage proposal at the end of the 2007 Fiesta Bowl. Johnson, who is black, and Popadics, who is white, hired security for their wedding due to the threats.

Johnson and his wife have one daughter, Johannah.

Johnson crocheted during his spare time while at Boise State, giving beanies away to teammates after being prohibited from selling them by the NCAA.

See also 
 List of NCAA Division I FBS running backs with at least 50 career rushing touchdowns
 List of NCAA major college football yearly rushing leaders
 List of NCAA major college football yearly scoring leaders

References

External links 

 Official Boise State bio
 49ers Bio
 

1985 births
Living people
People from Monrovia, California
People from San Dimas, California
Players of American football from California
American football running backs
Boise State Broncos football players
Minnesota Vikings players
Arizona Cardinals players
Detroit Lions players
San Francisco 49ers players
Sportspeople from Los Angeles County, California